Roger Ghyselinck (6 February 1924 – 29 October 2005) was a Belgian racing cyclist. He rode in the 1949 Tour de France.

References

External links

1924 births
2005 deaths
Belgian male cyclists
Sportspeople from Ghent
Cyclists from East Flanders
20th-century Belgian people